Vidales is a surname. Notable people with the surname include:

Javier Vidales (born 1965), Spanish football manager
Luis Vidales (1904–1990), Colombian poet and writer

See also
Vidale